Beveren lace was bobbin lace that was made at Beveren a few miles west of Antwerp. Lille lace, as well, as Belgium laces, was made there in the nineteenth century.

The characteristics of Beveren lace are:
 It is a continuous lace, where the whole lace is made at the same time.
 The headside often has a straight border, adorned with picots.
 Typical motifs are flowers (feathers), accentuated by a gimp thread.
 There are square tallies or leaves.

References

Bobbin lace
Textile arts of Belgium